Adolph Joseph Antoine Trillard was Governor General for Inde française in the Second French Colonial Empire under Third Republic.

Titles Held

Governors of French India
People of the French Third Republic